The Fokker T.V was a twin-engine bomber, described as an "aerial cruiser", built by Fokker for the Netherlands Air Force.

Modern for its time, by the German invasion of 1940 it was outclassed by the airplanes of the Luftwaffe, although it was used with some success.

Development and design
In the early 1930s, the Luchtvaartafdeling (i.e. the Netherlands Army Air Force) became interested in the luchtkruiser (aerial cruiser) concept multipurpose aircraft, which was to have a primary role of intercepting and destroying enemy bomber formations, with a secondary role as a long-range bomber, with Colonel P.W. Best, commander of the Luchtvaartafdeling stating on 28 March 1935 that aircraft of the luchtkruiser should be purchased in as large numbers as possible, proposing to cancel procurement of the Fokker D.XXI fighter to release funds.

To meet this requirement, Fokker developed the T.V, a five-seat, twin-engined monoplane. It featured a wooden wing, while the slab-sided fuselage was of mixed construction, with a wooden monocoque centre fuselage, a fabric covered steel tube rear fuselage and a duralumin forward fuselage. While this construction method was typical for Fokker aircraft, it was obsolete compared with contemporary aircraft of its size, which were normally of all-metal construction.  It was fitted with a 20 mm autocannon in the nose to meet the bomber destroyer part of the requirement, and four defensive Browning machine guns, one each in dorsal, ventral and tail positions, with one capable of being switched between two waist positions. It had a bomb-bay under the centre fuselage capable of carrying up to 1,000 kg (2,200 lb) of bombs.

A contract was signed for 16 T.Vs on 7 December 1936, with the first aircraft (not a prototype as such) flying on 16 October 1937 from Schiphol airfield.

Operational history
The first 11 T.Vs, by now considered medium bombers, were delivered in 1938, with the last 4 following in 1939. Although it had good handling characteristics, it suffered from reliability problems with its engines and propellers, and by the summer of 1939, the Netherlands was planning to purchase 24 Dornier Do 215s to replace them.

On 10 May 1940, Germany invaded the Netherlands, Belgium and Luxembourg. The T.V saw its first combat, when taking off from Schiphol to avoid air attack, eight T.Vs encountered a formation of German bombers, shooting down two. After this, the T.V reverted to its primary bomber role, being used in attacks against German airborne troops landing at The Hague and Rotterdam. By the end of the first day of fighting only two T.Vs were serviceable, being sent against bridges over the River Maas at Rotterdam on 11 May, where a further aircraft was shot down, with the final T.V being shot down during attacks on bridges at Moerdijk on 13 May.

As the T.V lacked self-sealing fuel tanks, they gained a reputation for rapidly catching fire when hit by enemy fire.

Operators

Royal Netherlands Air Force

Specifications

See also

References

Further reading
 Gerdessen, Frits and Luuk Boerman. Fokker T.V 'Luchtkruiser':  History, Camouflage and Markings (Bilingual English-Dutch). Zwammerdam, the Netherlands: Dutch Profile Publications, 2009. .
 Hooftman, Hugo. Van Brik tot Freedom Fighter: 1. Met Stofbril en Leren Vliegkap (In Dutch). Zwolle, the Netherlands: La Rivière & Voorhoeve N.V., 1963.
 Hooftman, Hugo. Fokker T-V en T-IX (Nederlandse Vliegtuigencyclopedie 8) (In Dutch). Bennekom, the Netherlands: Cockpit UItgeverij, 1979.
 Van der Klaauw, Bart. "Frustrated Fokker". Air International, November 1986, Vol 31 No 6, Bromley, UK:Fine Scroll. ISSN 0306-5634. pp. 241–249.
 Van der Klaauw, Bart. Bommenwerpers Wereldoorlog II, deel 2 (In Dutch). Alkmaar, the Netherlands: Uitgeverij de Alk bv.

External links

 

1930s Dutch bomber aircraft
T 05
Low-wing aircraft
Aircraft first flown in 1937
Twin piston-engined tractor aircraft